Ennismore is the second solo studio album by the English singer Colin Blunstone of rock band the Zombies. The name of the album comes from Ennismore Gardens, a square in Knightsbridge where Blunstone was living; the name being a variant spelling of the island Inishmore.

It was originally released in November 1972 on the label Epic. The lead single "I Don't Believe in Miracles" peaked at No. 31 on the UK Singles Chart, and "How Could We Dare to Be Wrong" peaked No. 45. Ennismore was reissued on CD by Sony in 2003.

As with Blunstone's 1971 debut album One Year, Ennismore was produced by Rod Argent and Chris White and most of the songs were backed by Argent's band Argent.

Critical reception

Robin Platts of AllMusic retrospectively gave the album four out of five stars and wrote that "Opinions differ as to which of the two is Blunstone's best album, but both One Year and Ennismore are consistently strong records and are bound to please anyone who has enjoyed Colin's work with the Zombies."

Track listing
"I Don't Believe in Miracles" (Russ Ballard) – 3:03
"Quartet: Exclusively for Me" (Colin Blunstone, David Jones) – 2:30
"Quartet: A Sign from Me to You" (Blunstone) – 3:58
"Quartet: Every Sound I Heard" (Blunstone, David Jones) – 2:26
"Quartet: How Wrong Can One Man Be" (Blunstone) – 2:02
"I Want Some More" (Blunstone) – 3:08
"Pay Me Later" (Blunstone, Phil Dennys) – 2:46
"Andorra" (Rod Argent, Chris White) – 3:18
"I've Always Had You" (Blunstone) – 2:32
"Time's Running Out" (Blunstone) – 2:41
"How Could We Dare to Be Wrong" (Blunstone, Phil Dennys) – 3:24

Personnel
Colin Blunstone – vocals; guitar
Rod Argent – piano; keyboards
Russ Ballard – guitar; piano; keyboards
Steve Bingham – bass guitar
Jim Rodford – bass guitar
Robert Henrit – drums
Byron Lye Foot – drums
Jim Toomey – drums
Terry Poole – drums; bass guitar
Phil Dennys – piano; keyboards
Pete Wingfield – piano; keyboards
Derek Griffiths – guitar
Michael Snow – guitar; keyboards

Production
Rod Argent – producer
Chris White – producer
Peter Vince – engineer
Steve Campbell – cover photography
Chris Gunning – string arrangements
Dan Loggins – adviser
David Lowe – photography

References

External links

1972 albums
Colin Blunstone albums
Albums produced by Rod Argent
Albums produced by Chris White (musician)
Epic Records albums